Ivar Michal Ulekleiv (born 22 May 1966) is a former Norwegian biathlete. He was born in Dombås, and represented the club Dovre Skiskytterlag. He competed at the 1994 Winter Olympics in Lillehammer.

He won a silver medal in the team event at the Biathlon World Championships 1991, together with Sverre Istad, Jon Åge Tyldum and Frode Løberg.

Biathlon results
All results are sourced from the International Biathlon Union.

Olympic Games

World Championships
1 medal (1 silver)

*During Olympic seasons competitions are only held for those events not included in the Olympic program.

References

External links
 
 

1966 births
Living people
People from Dovre
People from Dombås
Norwegian male biathletes
Biathletes at the 1994 Winter Olympics
Olympic biathletes of Norway
Biathlon World Championships medalists
Sportspeople from Innlandet